The Tibesti Hotel is a hotel situated overlooking the harbour of the 23rd July Lake in the city centre of Benghazi, Libya.

Description
At fifteen stories tall, it is a particularly prominent building with 242 rooms.

2011 bomb attack
On 1 June 2011, the hotel came to international attention during the Libyan Civil War when explosives were detonated in a car nearby.  A spokesman for the National Transitional Council called the bombing a "cowardly act". It was suspected that an officer was killed, and many people started to shout chants against Muammar Gaddafi while the hotel was being cordoned off.

See also

List of buildings and structures in Libya

References

External links
tebistyhotel.com, hotel's official website

Hotel buildings completed in 1989
Hotels in Benghazi